Alabama elected its members August 1–3, 1827, after the term began but before the new Congress convened.

Notes

See also 
 1826 and 1827 United States House of Representatives elections
 List of United States representatives from Alabama

1827
Alabama
United States House of Representatives